The Ohio Department of Natural Resources Division of Forestry manages 23 state forests.

Ohio state forests

See also
 List of U.S. National Forests
 Protected areas of Ohio
 Southern Great Lakes forests

References

External links
 Ohio Dept of Natural Resources Division of Forestry Overview of the Division

Ohio
State forests